Delta High School (or DHS) is a high school in Pasco, Washington, United States.  It provides a STEM-based curriculum for students in grades 9-12 from three school districts in the Tri-Cities area.  The school is operated as a collaborative effort by the Kennewick School District, Pasco School District, and Richland School District, and in partnerships with a local skill center, colleges, and businesses.  The school has been designated by the State of Washington as an Existing Innovative School.

Academic
The school's courses are geared towards a heavy focus on the STEM fields:  science, technology, engineering, and mathematics.  The study of English, Language Arts, and Social Studies is integrated with STEM subjects.  Courses offered each year vary depending on the student population.  Teaching methods emphasize student inquiry, problem-solving, and project-based learning.
Graduating requirements are based on each school district's requirements for total credits and minimum credits in each field of study.

History and facilities
Delta High School opened in 2009 with 100 students, the first full school year was in 2010, and approximately 400 students were expected by 2012.  Each school district is allocated approximately 1/3 of the enrollment for its students.  Approximately 40 percent of the first year's 100 enrollees left the school, mostly in the first year, reportedly due to frustration with the start-up of the new school and the rigorous program.  The first graduating class was in the spring of 2013 when 62 students graduated.  By 2013 the school was receiving 300 applications for approximately 100 places.

Through the 2014-2015 school year, the school operated in a group of buildings owned by Columbia Basin College in Pasco, Washington.  After a years long effort to locate and build a new permanent campus, a site was located and construction of new permanent facilities were completed for the start of the 2015-2016 school year in Pasco, Washington.  The new campus was officially dedicated on October 8, 2015 on 5801 Broadmoor Blvd.

Community partners
In addition to the three public school districts, the school partners with Columbia Basin College, Washington State University - Tri-Cities, Washington State STEM Education Foundation, and Battelle Memorial Institute.

References

External links

Public high schools in Washington (state)
High schools in Benton County, Washington
Richland, Washington
Tri-Cities, Washington